Sanford Jackson (January 10, 1900 – April 17, 1984) was an American Negro league baseball player. Contemporary newspapers often referred to him as Stanford Jackson. He played for the Birmingham Black Barons, Memphis Red Sox, and Chicago American Giants from 1923 to 1931. He was part of the Chicago American Giants teams that won the 1926 and 1927 Colored World Series.

References

External links
 and Baseball-Reference Black Baseball stats and Seamheads

1900 births
1984 deaths
Birmingham Black Barons players
Memphis Red Sox players
Chicago American Giants players
Baseball players from New Orleans
20th-century African-American sportspeople